Peter Paul Rubens (1577–1640) was a Flemish artist from the Rubens family.

Rubens may also refer to:

People with the name

Family name
 Rubens family, related to Peter Paul Rubens

 Albert Rubens (1614–1657), Flemish scholar and administrator, son of Peter Paul Rubens
 Alexander Rubens, Lord of Vremdyck (died 1752), Flemish grandson of Peter Paul Rubens
 Alma Rubens (1897–1931), American actor
 Arnold Frans Rubens (1687–1719), a Flemish painter
 Bernice Rubens (1928–2004), Welsh novelist
 Gerardus Rubens (1674–1736) Flemish Cistercian Abbot, grandnephew of Peter Paul Rubens
 Heinrich Rubens (1865–1922), German physicist
 Jan Rubens (1530–1587), Flemish magistrate, father of Peter Paul Rubens
 Jeff Rubens (born 1941), American bridge player
 Michael Rubens, American comedian and author
 Nicolaas Rubens, Lord of Rameyen  (1618–1655), Flemish son of Peter Paul Rubens
 Paul Rubens (composer) (fl. c. 1900), co-lyricist of Florodora
 Philip Rubens (1574–1611), Flemish scholar and administrator, brother of Peter Paul Rubens
 Shona Rubens (born 1986), Australia-born Canadian skier
 Sibylla Rubens German singer

Given name
 Rubens (footballer, 1928-1991), full name Rubens Josué da Costa, Brazilian football forward
 Rubens (footballer, born 1941), full name Jorge Caetano Rubens, Brazilian football midfielder
 Rubens Barrichello (born 1972), Brazilian Formula One race driver
 Rubens Donizete (born 1979), Brazilian mountain biker
 Rubens (footballer, born 2001), Rubens Antonio Dias, Brazilian football midfielder

Species
 Amastra rubens, a species of air-breathing land snail
 Anitys rubens, a species of beetle
 Calanthe rubens, a species of orchid
 Crassocephalum rubens, a species of edible, erect annual herb
 Inquisitor rubens,  a sea snail species
 Knema rubens, a species of plant in the family Myristicaceae
 Nidularium rubens, a species of plant in the family Bromeliaceae
 Omphalotropis rubens, a species of land snail
 Orthetrum rubens, a species of dragonfly
 Picea rubens, a species of Red Spruce tree
 Podocarpus rubens, a species of conifer
 Polymastia rubens, a species of demosponge
 Saurauia rubens, a species in the gooseberry family, Actinidiaceae

Other uses
 Rubens (film), a 1977 Belgian film
 Rubens (horse), a 19th-century Thoroughbred racehorse
 Rubens (train), a Paris-Brussels express train 1974–1995
 Rubens, Iowa, a ghost town
 10151 Rubens, a main-belt asteroid
 Rubens apple, an apple cultivar
 The Rubens, an Australian alternative rock band
 The Rubens (album)

See also 
 
 Rubenesque
 Reuben (disambiguation)
 Reubens (disambiguation)

Dutch-language surnames
Germanic-language surnames
Patronymic surnames